Acacia viscifolia is a shrub of the genus Acacia and the subgenus Plurinerves that is endemic to an area of south western Australia.

Description
Like most species of Acacia it has phyllodes rather than true leaves. It blooms from June to August and produces yellow flowers. It produces inflorescences that appear in groups of three to four on racemes and are composed of spherical flower-heads composed of 20 to 25 yellow flowers.

Taxonomy
The species was first formally described by the botanists Joseph Maiden and William Blakely in 1927 as a part of the work Descriptions of fifty new species and six varieties of western and northern Australian Acacias, and notes on four other species published in the work Journal of the Royal Society of Western Australia. It was reclassified as Racosperma viscifolium in 2003 by Leslie Pedley then returned to genus Acacia in 2006.

Distribution
It is native to an area in the Wheatbelt and Great Southern regions of Western Australia where it is often found in low-lying areas usually around ricers, creek and swamps growing in sandy, clay or loamy soils.

See also
List of Acacia species

References

viscifolia
Acacias of Western Australia
Taxa named by Joseph Maiden
Taxa named by William Blakely
Plants described in 1927